
Gmina Tomaszów Lubelski is a rural gmina (administrative district) in Tomaszów Lubelski County, Lublin Voivodeship, in eastern Poland. Its seat is the town of Tomaszów Lubelski, although the town is not part of the territory of the gmina.

The gmina contains part of the protected area called Krasnobród Landscape Park.

Villages
Gmina Tomaszów Lubelski contains the villages and settlements of Bujsce, Bukowina, Chorążanka, Cieplachy, Cybulówka, Dąbrowa, Długie, Dobrzanówka, Dolina, Dub, Folwarczysko, Glinianki, Górno, Irenówka, Jeziernia, Justynówka, Kapisówka, Kątek, Klekacz, Klimowice, Łaszczówka, Łaszczówka-Kolonia, Ławki, Lipka, Majdan Górny, Majdanek, Maziarnia, Nowa Wieś, Nowy Przeorsk, Parama, Pardasówka, Pasieki, Podbełżec, Podbór, Podhorce, Polesie, Przecinka, Przeorsk, Rabinówka, Rogowe Kopce, Rogóźno, Rogóźno-Kolonia, Ruda Wołoska, Ruda Żelazna, Sabaudia, Siwa Dolina, Sołokija, Sutki, Sybir, Szarowola, Szkoci Dół, Sznury, Typin, Ulów, Wieprzowe Jezioro, Wygon and Zamiany.

Neighbouring gminas
Gmina Tomaszów Lubelski is bordered by the town of Tomaszów Lubelski and by the gminas of Bełżec, Jarczów, Krasnobród, Lubycza Królewska, Narol, Rachanie, Susiec and Tarnawatka.

References

Polish official population figures 2006

Tomaszow Lubelski
Tomaszów Lubelski County